The Man in the Rushes (German: Der Mann im Schilf) is a 1978 West German thriller film directed by Manfred Purzer and starring Jean Sorel, Erika Pluhar and Nathalie Delon.

The film's sets were designed by the art director Peter Rothe.

Cast
 Jean Sorel as Robert 
 Erika Pluhar as Hannah 
 Nathalie Delon as Loraine 
 Bernhard Wicki as Sir Gerald 
 Heinrich Schweiger as Mostbaumer 
 Kurt Weinzierl as Schemnitzky 
 Karl Renar as Sedlak 
 Heinz Bennent as Felix 
 Tilo Prückner as Landstreicher 
 Rudolf Schündler as Pfarrer 
 Franz Gary as Florian

References

Bibliography 
 Bock, Hans-Michael & Bergfelder, Tim. The Concise Cinegraph: Encyclopaedia of German Cinema. Berghahn Books, 2009.

External links 
 

1978 films
1970s thriller films
German thriller films
West German films
1970s German-language films
Films directed by Manfred Purzer
Films set in the 1930s
Films set in Austria
Constantin Film films
1970s German films